3rd Kings was an electoral district in the Canadian province of Prince Edward Island, which elected two members to the Legislative Assembly of Prince Edward Island from 1873 to 1993.

The district comprised the western central portion of Kings County. It was abolished in 1996.

Members

Dual member

Assemblyman-Councillor

Kings 3
1873 establishments in Prince Edward Island
1996 disestablishments in Prince Edward Island